Doufelgou is a prefecture located in the Kara Region of Togo. The capital city is Niamtougou. 

Doufelgou means White Mountain (white= felm & mountain= dour).

The cantons (or subdivisions) of Doufelgou include Niamtougou, Siou, Défalé, Alloum, Massédéna, Kadjalla, Pouda, Léon, Agbandé-Yaka, Baga, Ténéga, Kpaha, Koka, and Tchoré.

Towns and villages
Agbande, Agounde, Akare, Akpante, Aliande, Aloum, Aloumere, Andjide, Aniandide, Anima, Atiaka, Baga, Bontan, Bourgou, Defale, Djorergou, Doudongue, Hago, Houde, Kadjala, Kaparama, Kapoo, Kawanga, Kore, Koubakou, Kouka, Koukou, Koukpandiada, Koularo, Kounfaga, Kounyanetme, Koussourkou, Koutougou, Kouwahaya, Kpadibe, Kpadero, Kpaha, Lao, Leon, Lokorea, Massedena, Misseouta, Niamtougou, Niatin, Ntounkwe, Oudiran, Paboute, Padebe, Palaka, Palako, Palanko, Passoute, Pilia, Pouda, Pouffa, Pouroum, Selebino, Semouhourl, Sihebi, Siou, Sioudouga, Sode, Soulao, Tagbesse, Talada, Tanakou, Tapouenta, Tapounde, Tchitchide, Tchitchide Tare, Tenega, Tidira, Togarhaouide, Walade, Wianne, Yaka, Yaoute, Yawaka

References 

 
Prefectures of Togo
Kara Region